City Girl may refer to:

 City Girl (1930 film), a silent film directed by F.W. Murnau
 City Girl (1938 film), starring Ricardo Cortez and Phyllis Brooks
 City Girl (1984 film), directed by Martha Coolidge
 "City Girl" (song), by Kevin Shields
 "City Girl", German hit song by Peter Orloff
 City Girls, female rap duo